Kohanshahr may refer to:
 Kohanshahr-e Olya
 Kohanshahr-e Sofla